Gilan (also Romanized as Gīlān; also known as Gilan Mal Viran) is a village in Susan-e Gharbi Rural District, Susan District, Izeh County, Khuzestan Province, Iran. At the 2006 census, its population was 165, in 29 families.

References 

Populated places in Izeh County